

In Islam 
 An-Nur, one of the names of God in Islam, meaning "The Light".
 Nūr (Islam), a concept, literally meaning "light"
 An-Nur (The Light), the 24th chapter of the Qur'an
 Risale-i Nur Collection, a collection of works by Islamic scholar Said Nursî

People 
 Nur (name)
Nur Fatima Mehdi, Pakistani descent born in New Zealand.

Places 
 Nur, Iran (disambiguation)
 Nur, Poland
 Nur County, in Iran
 Nur Mountains "Mountains of Holy Light", a mountain range in Turkey
 NUR Reactor, a research reactor in Algiers
 Nur University (Bolivia)
 National University of Rwanda
 Nuristan Province, Afghanistan

Other uses 
 Nur (biology), a family of transcription factors
 National Union of Railwaymen, a trade union in the United Kingdom
Nur (Rawalpindi) railway station a railway station in Pakistan
Nur railway station a railway station in Pakistan
Nur (TV series), a Malaysian television series
Nur, a moon in the video game Star Wars Jedi: Fallen Order

See also 
 Noor (disambiguation)